John Hilton and Jack Hilton may refer to:

John Hilton 

John Buxton Hilton (1921–1986), British crime writer
John Hilton (American football) (1942–2017), American football tight end
John Hilton the elder (1565–1609), British composer
John Hilton the younger (c. 1599–1657), British composer, son of the above
John Hilton (industrial relations) (1880–1943), British professor of industrial relations
John Hilton (manufacturer) (c. 1791–1866), Canadian businessperson
John Hilton (surgeon) (1805–1878), British surgeon
John Hilton (table tennis) (born 1947), retired British table tennis player
John Hilton (cricketer, born 1792) (1792–?), English cricketer
John Hilton (cricketer, born 1838) (1838–1910), English cricketer.
John T. Hilton (1801–1864), African-American abolitionist and businessman
John Hilton Grace (1873–1958), British mathematician
John Hilton (soccer) (born 2001), American soccer player

Jack Hilton 

Jack Hilton (1921–1998), rugby league footballer of the 1940s and 1950s for Great Britain, England, and Wigan
Jack Hilton (author) (19001983), British novelist, essayist, and travel writer
Jack Hilton (footballer) (born 1925), English footballer who made appearances in the English Football League with Wrexham

See also
Jack Hylton (1892–1965), British band leader and impresario
John Hylton, de jure 18th Baron Hylton (1699–1746), English politician